Fiona O'Brien is an Irish women's rugby player who received her first cap in the opening match of the 2015 Women's Six Nations against  on 6 February.  won, 30–5.

O'Brien plays for Old Belvedere and Leinster's women's teams.

References

1988 births
Living people
Irish female rugby union players
Rugby union props
Ireland women's international rugby union players
Old Belvedere R.F.C. players
Rugby union players from County Waterford
Leinster Rugby women's players